Floralba Uribe Marín (sometimes, Flor Alba Uribe Marín; 1943–2005) was a Colombian writer, poet, critic and activist for women's rights. She was born in Leticia, in 1943. Her debut novel Historia de la pequeña Nubia y de su mercenaria virginidad was published in 1979. Other works include essays such as La mujer en la obra de García Márquez and La mujer en la obra de Pablo Neruda, and the book Erótica: poesía y cuento. She was vice-president of the Unión Nacional de Escritores.

References

Colombian writers
1943 births
2005 deaths